Benjamin Hart (born 1977) is an English actor.

Benjamin Hart may also refer to:

 Benjamin Hart (businessman) (1779–1855), Canadian businessman
 Benjamin Hart (cricketer) (born 1977), New Zealand cricketer
 Ben Hart (Australian footballer) (born 1974), Australian rules footballer
 Ben Hart (magician) (born 1990), British magician
 Ben Hart (footballer, born 2000), English footballer